Dr.Isaac K. Chinebuah (7 October 1929 – 8 June 2006) was an academic and the foreign minister in the People's National Party (PNP) government of the  Third Republic of Ghana.

Career 
Dr. Chinebuah was a former headmaster of Achimota School from 1963 to 1966 and also a former lecturer at the Institute of African Studies of the University of Ghana, Legon.
He was a Minister for Education and Information in Dr. Kwame Nkrumah's Convention People's Party government in the First Republic of Ghana.

Dr. Chinebuah became the Member of Parliament for Nzema East (now Ellembelle) constituency after the 1979 elections. He was appointed Minister of Foreign Affairs in the PNP government by Dr. Hilla Limann in the Third Republic from 1979 until its overthrow in a coup d'état on December 31, 1981. He became the running mate to Dr. Hilla Limann during the 1992 presidential election.

He died at the age of 78 on June 8, 2006. He was married to Jane Chinebuah. He had eight children.

Notes and references

See also 
 Minister for Foreign Affairs (Ghana)
 Limann government

1929 births
2006 deaths
Ghanaian MPs 1979–1981
20th-century Ghanaian people
Academic staff of the University of Ghana
Heads of schools in Ghana
People's National Party (Ghana) politicians
Foreign ministers of Ghana